Kumbharia or Kumbhariya is a village in Anjar Taluka of Kutch District of Gujarat State of India.  It is situated at a distance of 14  km from Anjar town, the taluka headquarters.

History

Kumbharia  is one of the 18 villages founded by Kutch Gurjar Kshatriyas or Mistris. These Mistri community first moved into Saurashtra from Rajasthan in the early 7th century and later a major group entered Kutch in the 12th century AD and established themselves at Dhaneti. Later in the 12th century onwards they moved between Anjar and Bhuj and founded the villages of Anjar, Sinugra, Khambhra, Nagalpar, Khedoi, Madhapar, Hajapar, Kukma, Galpadar, Reha, Vidi, Jambudi, Devaliya, Lovaria, Nagor, Chandiya, Meghpar and Kumbharia.

These group of warriors were also talented architects and have contributed in erection of most of the historical architect of Kutch The Mistris of these villages have built and developed the infrastructure, temples, community halls, a huge pond in & around the villages in mid to late 19th century. Many of them were follower of Swaminarayan sect of Hinduism. Some of these Mistris made it big during early days of Railways construction by British during 1860-1930 and established themselves as contractors and coal mines owners in Jharia.

Temples

Kuldevi Temples of many clans of these Kutch Gurjar Kshatriyas community are also there in this village. The Kuldevi of temples of Chamunda Mata of Rathod, Brahmani Mata of Chauhan, Brahmani Mata of Vegad, Chaval Mata or Khodiyar Mata of Savaria, Chudasama, Khodiyar clans are in this village.

Further, the known Mahadev temple of Nageshwar Mahadev Temple built by founders of the village is also located within the village and so is Thakor Mandir.

Further, Swaminarayan Temple and Dharamshala are also there in village, which was originally built by famous Railway Contractor of the village, Jiwan Narayan Chauhan in 1868. It has since been further renovated and expanded.

References

External links
 Kutch District, official website

Villages in Kutch district